Shotty is a Microsoft Windows application that captures screenshots. A key benefit of Shotty is that it captures Aero glass frame transparency and shadow if running on Windows Vista or Windows 7.

It can also change the glass color automatically. Shotty allows modification of screenshots: it has features for cropping images, unsharpening a region to make it clearer, drawing rectangles to draw focus to one section of the image, and highlighting text. Shotty also allows uploading screenshots to the internet.

See also
 Snagit
 Window Clippings
 Jing

External links

Reviews

Screenshot software
Windows-only shareware